Goalanda may refer to:

Goalanda Upazila
Goalanda Ghat